Whitney Run is a  long 1st order tributary to Stony Run in Clearfield County, Pennsylvania.

Course 
Whitney Run rises about 1 mile south of Anderson Creek, Pennsylvania, and then flows generally west to join Stony Run about 2 miles northeast of Home Camp.

Watershed 
Whitney Run drains  of area, receives about 45.1 in/year of precipitation, has a wetness index of 440.18, and is about 90% forested.

See also 
 List of Pennsylvania Rivers

References

Watershed Maps 

Rivers of Pennsylvania
Rivers of Clearfield County, Pennsylvania